Surendra vivarna, the acacia blue, is a species of lycaenid or hairstreak butterfly found in Sri Lanka, India and the Indonesian islands as far as Sulawesi.

Range
Its range is similar to that of its genus, Surendra, except it is not recorded from China or the Philippines proper (where it is replaced by S. maniliana), but from Balabac, Palawan and the Calamian Islands.

Description

Subspecies
 Surendra vivarna amisena Hewitson, 1862, (South Burma, Thailand, Malaya, and Sumatra) 
 Surendra vivarna palowna Staudinger, 1889, (Borneo) 
 Surendra vivarna samina Fruhstorfer, 1904, (Sulawesi) 
 Surendra vivarna agdistis Fruhstorfer  (Nias)
 Surendra vivarna biplagiata Butler, 1883 (southern India)
 Surendra vivarna latimargo Moore, 1879 (Andamans) 
 Surendra vivarna discalis Moore (Sri Lanka)

Food plants
Fabaceae (Acacia, Albizia, Paraserianthes) and it is facultatively attended by various ants.

See also
Lycaenidae
List of butterflies of India
List of butterflies of India (Lycaenidae)

Cited references

Arhopalini
Butterflies of Singapore
Butterflies of Borneo
Butterflies of Indonesia
Butterflies described in 1829